Confederation of Independent Poland (KPN) was a Polish nationalist political party founded on 1 September 1979 by Leszek Moczulski and others declaring support for the pre-war traditions of Sanacja and Józef Piłsudski.

It was the first independent political party that was publicly proclaimed in the Eastern Bloc, it was however unrecognized by the communistic People's Republic of Poland government and its chief activists were arrested several times. It didn't participate in the Polish Roundtable Negotiations with the communists.

History

Foundation 

After the fragmentation of the anti-communist ROPCiO (Movement for the protection of human and civil rights), former leader Leszek Moczulski began preoparing structures for a new organization with other independence activists, most importantly Romuald Szeremietiew and Tadeusz Stański. It was decided that the new organization would be a Confedertion (that is how parties in the Polish-Lithuanian Commonwealth were called) of many different groupings of Piłsudskiite and Sanation tradition. This new organization declared continuity with the 1913 Komisja Tymczasowych Skonfederowanych Strnonnicstw Niepodległościowych.

Leszek Moczulski wrote the founding document of the new party - A revolution without a revolution, which was a reference to Piłsudski's concept of a "revolution without revolutionary consequences". The party would officially be established on the 40th anniversary of the outbreak of World War 2, on 1 September 1979 during celebrations in front of the ruins of the Saxon Palace, the Tomb of the Unknown Soldier, a symbol for pre-war independent Poland.

The founding "Act of the Confederation of Independent Poland" was signed by 35 founding members of the party. 20 of these founding members were arrested that same day by the communist dictatorship, the other 15 followed in the same week. The party would be the first independent party founded in the communist eastern bloc.

On 17 September 1979 Leszek Moczulski was elected the leader of the party, at a meeting in Moczulski's department. The meeting was interrupted by the communist Polish Security Service and most of the participants were arrested.

Further Development and Opposition 
With the election of Leszek Moczulski, the KPN had a unique position. It would organize central administrations for each of Poland's regions and set voievodes for each, bearing similarity to the wartime Armia Krajowa. The party newspaper was called "Droga" and was in direct tradition with the pre-war Piłsudskiite newspaper "Gazeta Polska".

Another important reference to Piłsudski's Second Polish Republic were the independence anniversary celebrations celebrated on 11 November 1979 in Kraków, carrying banners with Piłsudski through the old capital. Such celebrations were organized throughout the entire communist period from then on and would often end with intervention of the communist Citizen's Militia and mass arrests.

Party leader Leszek Moczulski, together with founding member Romuald Szeremietiew and others, were arrested and sentenced to prison for allegedly wanting to overthrow the communist government in 1981, but were released in 1984 with amnesty. After the declaration of Martial Law by General Wojciech Jaruzelski, head of the Polish United Worker's Party, the arrests of KPN members increased drastically.

The Confederacy had contacts to the government of the pre-war Second Polish Republic, which went into exile during the Second World War. President-in-exile Kazimierz Sabbat invited the activists to London, where they would meet the President.

In the 1980s the Confederacy of Independent Poland continued activities alongside the rising Solidarity movement until the Communist dictatorship ended in 1989 and the Polish government-in-exile returned from exile in London.

After the Fall of Communism 
After the fall of communism, Leszek Moczulski was a candidate in the elections for Polish president, but got only 2.5% of votes in the 1990 presidential election and withdrew during the following one. In the 1991 parliamentary election the party got 7.5% of the vote, while in the 1993 parliamentary election it received 5.7%.

In 1996 it suffered a split, with the  faction under  leaving KPN. KPN then joined Solidarity Electoral Action, but left it in 1997, before the 1997 parliamentary election, in which it didn't participate. For the 2001 parliamentary elections, it allied itself with Solidarity Electoral Action of the Right (AWSP), but its candidates got 0.08% and the AWSP (which got 5.6%) failed to elect a single representative (the threshold was 8%).

In 2003 Leszek Moczulski dissolved the KPN, while Słomka declared his KPN-OP the main KPN and gathered some members of the now-disbanded Moczulski's KPN. The party has been re-registered with the Polish authorities in 2007 and took part in the 2009 European parliament elections.

The party is active today under the leadership of Adam Słomka. The main goals of the party are the decomunization of the Polish courts and the preparation for an Intermarium Federation, as Piłsudski envisioned it. 

After the outbreak of the Russian invasion of Ukraine in 2022, Adam Słomka gathered voulenteers and formed the paramilitary Polish Legion in Kraków, which in reference to Piłsudski's legions marched from the Oleandry avenue. Adam Słomka's Polish Legion left for Ukraine, where they are helping with the war effort.

Election results

Sejm

Senate

See also
Federation of Fighting Youth
Solidarity
Nonpartisan Bloc for Support of Reforms

References

1979 establishments in Poland
Anti-communism in Poland
Anti-communist parties
Defunct political parties in Poland
History of Poland (1989–present)
Nationalist parties in Poland
Polish dissident organisations
Polish nationalist parties
Political parties established in 1979